Glenn Langan (July 8, 1917 – January 26, 1991) was an American character actor on stage and films.

Early years

Born in Denver, Colorado, Langan was the son of Thomas Langan and Kate Quinn Langan. He attended schools there. His early training in acting came in Denver, where he was stage manager at Elitch's Gardens, handling various behind-the-scenes duties.

Langan went to New York, washing dishes in a cafeteria and taking other jobs while he sought acting jobs by visiting producers' offices. Fainting on a street resulted in a stay in Polyclinic Hospital for treatment of malnutrition.

Career 
Langan made his Broadway debut in Glamour Preferred (1940). His other Broadway credits included A Kiss for Cinderella (1942), and Fancy Meeting You Again (1952). He made his credited film debut in The Return of Doctor X (1939). His other stage experiences included performing in Johnny Belinda and Glamor Preferred.

Langan appeared as a French professor in the romantic Margie (1946), a devoted young doctor protecting Gene Tierney from the evil machinations of Vincent Price in Dragonwyck (1946), and as one of the psychiatrists looking after demented patient Olivia de Havilland in The Snake Pit (1948). Langan also portrayed a privateer captain in Forever Amber (1947).

On old-time radio, Langan starred as police inspector Barton Drake on the Mutual crime drama Murder Is My Hobby. He also starred on the syndicated Mystery Is My Hobby, a revision of the earlier program.

Langan's work on television included portraying Jeff Standish on the comedy series Boss Lady (1952). On November 20, 1950, Langan co-starred with Mabel Taliaferro in "The Floor of Heaven" on Studio One on TV.

Later years/family
Langan was married to actress Adele Jergens, with whom he had a son, Tracy. He had earlier been married to showgirl Helen Weston.

Death
On January 26, 1991, Langan died of lymphoma at Pleasant Valley Hospital in Camarillo, California, aged 73.

Filmography

References

External links

 
 
 

1917 births
1991 deaths
American male film actors
American male stage actors
Male actors from Denver
20th-century American male actors
American male radio actors
American male television actors